Ayiroopara  is a village in Thiruvananthapuram district in the state of Kerala, India. It is a suburb of Thiruvananthapuram city.It successfully became an "institutional area" during urban planning in 2014.

Demographics
 India census, Iroopara had a population of 21,256 with 10,408 males and 10,848 females.

References

Villages in Thiruvananthapuram district